Phil Reeves is an American film and television actor and screenwriter. He is known for the roles of Charles Swedelson on the sitcom Girlfriends, new Vice President Andrew Doyle in HBO's Veep, as Chairman of the Joint Chiefs of Staff General Krieger in Commander in Chief, and as Dr. Klieger in the Wayons' My Wife and Kids.

Education 
Reeves earned a Bachelor of Arts degree in philosophy and English from Earlham College and a Master of Fine Arts from the Dallas Theater Center, where he was mentored by playwright Mark Medoff.

Career 
He has written scripts for several movies, including Happy, Texas (1999). A second film, The Other Side, is under production.

Among his television appearances are episodes of LA Law, Nowhere Man, 3rd Rock from the Sun, JAG, NYPD Blue, Desperate Housewives, Medium, The Office, Girlfriends, Brockmire, Brooklyn Nine-Nine, and HBO's Veep.

Reeves has appeared in several feature films, including many by Alexander Payne. Credits include Central Intelligence, About Schmidt, Election, 13 Going on 30, Sideways, and Fun with Dick and Jane. Reeves had a regular guest role in the NBC comedy television series Parks and Recreation as Paul Iaresco, the city manager of the fictional town of Pawnee, Indiana. He appeared as Commissioner of the NYPD John Kelly in several episodes of season 5 and 6 of Brooklyn Nine-Nine.

Reeves plays "Coach T" in a series of Toyota commercials that aired 2012–15.

His play From The Journal Of Hazard McCauley was published by Broadway Play Publishing Inc. He spent years on stage in regional theater both in Los Angeles (at the Mark Taper Forum) and elsewhere. His Broadway Tour credit includes Children of a Lesser God.

Filmography

Film

Television

References

External links

Living people
American male film actors
American male screenwriters
American male television actors
20th-century American male actors
21st-century American male actors
Place of birth missing (living people)
1946 births